Silent Voices is a Finnish progressive metal band from Kokkola, Finland. It was formed in 1995 by Henrik Klingenberg (keyboards), Pasi Kauppinen (bass), Timo Kauppinen (guitars), and Jukka-Pekka Koivisto (drums). A few years after their formation, the lineup saw the addition of Michael Henneken on vocals, who left in 2006. In September 2013, the band announced that their new singer was Teemu Koskela (Winterborn),  and in May 2014 founding member Jukka-Pekka Koivisto left and was replaced with Jani "Hurtsi" Hurula (Isänta Meidän).

The band has published an EP (with Klingenberg on vocals) and four studio albums, and are currently in the process of promoting their fourth and are touring whenever possible.

Their latest album Reveal The Change was released on November 29, 2013 in Europe and December 03 in North America.

Band members

Current members
 Timo Kauppinen – guitars 
 Pasi Kauppinen – bass 
 Jani "Hurtsi" Hurula – drums 
 Henrik Klingenberg – keyboards 
 Teemu Koskela – vocals

Former Members
 Michael Henneken – vocals 
 Jukka-Pekka Koivisto – drums

Discography
 Nothing Lasts Forever (EP) (1997)
 Chapters of Tragedy (2002)
 Infernal (2004)
 Building Up the Apathy (2006)
 Reveal the Change (2013)

References

External links 
Official Web Page
Feature on Reveal The Change

Finnish progressive metal musical groups